Tiantangwei railway station (formerly Tin Tong Wai) was a station in Fenggang Town, Dongguan City, Guangdong Province, China. It is a level 4 station according to the scale of stations by the Chinese Ministry of Railways. It is on the Guangzhou-Shenzhen and Jingjiu Railways, opened in 1911 and closed in 2005.

Buildings and structures in Dongguan
Railway stations in China opened in 1911
Railway stations closed in 2005
Stations on the Beijing–Kowloon Railway
Stations on the Guangzhou–Shenzhen Railway